The tangent-secant theorem  describes the relation of line segments created by a secant and a tangent line with the associated circle. 
This result is found as Proposition 36 in Book 3 of Euclid's Elements. 

Given a secant g intersecting the circle at points G1 and G2 and a tangent t intersecting the circle at point T and given that g and t intersect at point P, the following equation holds:

The tangent-secant theorem can be proven using similar triangles (see graphic).

Like the intersecting chords theorem and the intersecting secants theorem, the tangent-secant theorem represents one of the three basic cases of a more general theorem about two intersecting lines and a circle, namely, the power of point theorem.

References
S. Gottwald: The VNR Concise Encyclopedia of Mathematics. Springer, 2012, pp. 175-176
Michael L. O'Leary: Revolutions in Geometry. Wiley, 2010,  p. 161
Schülerduden - Mathematik I. Bibliographisches Institut & F.A. Brockhaus, 8. Auflage, Mannheim 2008, pp. 415-417 (German)

External links 
Tangent Secant Theorem at proofwiki.org
Power of a Point Theorem auf cut-the-knot.org

Theorems about circles